Hasići may refer to:

 Hasići (Glamoč), a village in Bosnia and Herzegovina
 Hasići (Ključ), a village in Bosnia and Herzegovina